Carlos Jorge Marques Caldas Xavier (born 26 January 1962) is a Portuguese retired footballer who played as a midfielder.

Club career
Born in Lourenço Marques, Portuguese Mozambique, Xavier began his professional career with Lisbon-based Sporting CP, already being a regular first-team fixture at age 19. He played 23 Primeira Liga games as the Lions won the title in the 1981–82 season, which would be the last until 2000.

In 1991, after more than 250 competitive appearances, Xavier moved, alongside compatriot and teammate Oceano, to Spain's Real Sociedad, where the pair was equally influential, having been reunited with former Sporting boss John Toshack at the La Liga side.

Both Xavier and Oceano returned to Sporting in the summer of 1994, and the former played two more years before retiring at the age of 34. In the 2004–05 campaign he had a brief spell at coaching, assisting at another club from the capital and the top division, G.D. Estoril Praia.

International career
Xavier won ten caps for Portugal, then switched successfully to its beach soccer team.

Personal life
Xavier's twin brother, Pedro, was also a footballer. A forward, he represented several teams in the country (coinciding with Carlos at Académica) in an 18-year professional career.

Xavier lived in Quinta da Beloura, a gated community in Sintra on the Portuguese Riviera.

References

External links

1962 births
Living people
Portuguese twins
Twin sportspeople
Sportspeople from Maputo
Portuguese footballers
Association football midfielders
Primeira Liga players
Sporting CP footballers
Associação Académica de Coimbra – O.A.F. players
La Liga players
Real Sociedad footballers
Portugal youth international footballers
Portugal under-21 international footballers
Portugal international footballers
Portuguese expatriate footballers
Expatriate footballers in Spain
Portuguese expatriate sportspeople in Spain